Veľká Ves nad Ipľom is a village and municipality in the Veľký Krtíš District of the Banská Bystrica Region of southern Slovakia.

External links
https://web.archive.org/web/20080111223415/http://www.statistics.sk/mosmis/eng/run.html 

Villages and municipalities in Veľký Krtíš District
Hungarian communities in Slovakia